Lee Jarvis (born 30 September 1976 in Pontypridd, Wales) is a former international Welsh rugby union player who was known as a top points scorer with the boot. His career has been spent in both Wales and England including top level rugby in Wales and in the Celtic League, winning a number of trophies in both countries. He has represented Wales from school level to full international honours as well as being selected by the Barbarians. Despite being tipped as the "next best thing" during his early career and being a great points kicker Jarvis only earned one cap for Wales at full international level. After retiring from rugby union as a player, Jarvis took up coaching. He is currently head coach at Rhydyfelin RFC.

Playing career

Early career 

An outside-half, he began his club career at his local club Pontypridd in 1995 where he was a member of the youth academy. Despite making an appearance in the Heineken Cup, Jarvis found opportunities limited at Pontypridd as Welsh legend Neil Jenkins was already firmly entrenched as the main man in his position at the club so he moved to local rivals Cardiff for the start of the 1996–97 season. Jarvis spent three seasons at Cardiff where he scored an incredible 1,000 points in his time there which also saw the club win the SWALEC Cup in his first season and included a career best performance in his second season of almost 500 points in all competitions. He also gained a cap (the only one of his career) for Wales - playing just two minutes against Romania in 1997 but typically still managing to score a conversion in the limited time he played. Despite a great scoring record at Cardiff, in 1999 Jarvis returning to his former club, Pontypridd, as part of a record £200,000 deal that the capital club paid for his former teammate Neil Jenkins.

Celtic League 

After two seasons at Pontypridd where he was once more one of the league's top scorers, Jarvis moved to Neath to coincide with the inaugural Celtic league - a competition which involved Welsh, Scottish and Irish clubs - helping the club to the quarter finals where they lost to Irish province Ulster. Along with appearances in the domestic Welsh league/cup, Jarvis amassed over 400 points including 100 in the Celtic League. In 2003 a further change to Welsh rugby led to the creation of five regional sides who replaced the original Welsh clubs in the Celtic League. Jarvis moved back east to join the Newport Gwent Dragons regional side. He only spent a season with the Dragons where he found opportunities limited by highly capped South African international Percy Montgomery and Craig Warlow (although as always he still had a decent points record from games played).

Move to Cornwall 

After nine years in Wales Jarvis decided to make the decision to move across the Bristol Channel to Cornwall where he joined the Cornish Pirates, an ambitious club plying their trade in the English second division, for the 2004–05 season. He made the decision partly due to pressure playing in Welsh rugby where for years he had been touted as the "next best thing" but had been unable to gain the international caps he had been expected to when he started his career. At Pirates he became a first team regular helping the club to gain very respectable 4th and 3rd-place positions in the league in the two seasons he was there.

Two years at Pirates were followed by another two seasons at nearby Mounts Bay. In two years at the Penzance-based club, Jarvis helped the club achieve two consecutive promotions from tier 5 up to tier 3 in what was a very exciting period for the short-lived club. As well as claiming two league titles, Mounts Bay also won the EDF Intermediate Cup and Cornish Super Cup in this period and on a personal note Jarvis was also top points scorer in National Division 3 South during his second year at the club. Despite enjoying life in Cornwall Jarvis received an offer from former club Cardiff to become player coach and he returned to Wales for the start of the 2008–09 season.

Return to Cardiff 

In his role as player-coach Jarvis still showed that he had a lot to offer the club, coming off the bench to help Cardiff defeat Glamorgan Wanderers, scoring three penalties and a drop goal in the final 30 minutes of a Principality Premiership game in November. He managed to score 294 points during the season in which Cardiff claimed the Principality Premiership title - their first since 2000. Jarvis was also selected for Cardiff Blues while at Cardiff and played an increasing role as a backs coach at the Blues Academy. In September 2010, Jarvis launched Lee Jarvis Kicking Clinics, an attempt to pass on his skills as a tactical and place kicker to a new generation of rugby players.

Coaching career

Merthyr 

After several years at Cardiff Blues, in 2013 Jarvis joined struggling Merthyr (then in Division 1 East) alongside Gary Horrigan as head coach. The Ironmen managed to survive relegation, beating Ystrad Rhondda on the last day of the season to stay up. Under the backing of multi millionaire Sir Stan Thomas, Merthyr then won the Division 1 East title to gain promotion to the Welsh Championship as well as claiming the SWALEC Plate.

Professional playing career

Playing honours 
Pontypridd
64 apparences, 712 points

Cardiff
117 apparences, 1339 points
Swalec Cup winners: 1996-97
Principality Premiership champions: 2008–09

Neath
No Data

Dragons
16 apparences, 72 points

 Cornish Pirates
48 apparences, 359 points

Mounts Bay
EDF Energy Intermediate Cup winners: 2006-07
South West Division 1 champions: 2006-07
Cornwall Super Cup winners: 2007-08
National Division 3 South champions: 2007–08
National Division 3 South top points scorer (266 points): 2007–08

Cardiff Blues
no data

International/Representative
Selected for Barbarians tour of Japan: 1996
Capped for Wales: 1997

Coaching honours 

Merthyr
Division 1 East champions: 2013-14
SWALEC Plate winners: 2013-14

References

External links
 Welsh Rugby Union player profiles
Pontypridd RFC profile

1976 births
Dragons RFC players
Pontypridd RFC players
Welsh rugby union coaches
Welsh rugby union players
Neath RFC players
Rugby union players from Pontypridd
Wales international rugby union players
Living people